Richard Lewis (1824 – January 1875) was the mayor of Victoria, British Columbia, for one term in 1872.

Lewis arrived in the Colony of Vancouver Island in 1858 from San Francisco. He was an architect by training, but started an undertaking business because of a lack of work for architects in the city's early days.

He served as an alderman on the first city council in 1862.

In the 1870s, Lewis returned to architecture, and designed the Masonic Temple and the Lascelles building at Government and Fort Streets.

See also
List of mayors of Victoria, British Columbia

References

1824 births
1875 deaths
Architects from London
Mayors of Victoria, British Columbia
English emigrants to pre-Confederation British Columbia
Pre-Confederation British Columbia people